A mirror world is a representation of the real world in digital form. It attempts to map real-world structures in a geographically accurate way. Mirror worlds offer a utilitarian software model of real human environments and their workings. It is very similar to the concept of a digital twin.

The term differs slightly from virtual worlds in that these have few direct connections to real models and thus are described more as fictions, while mirror worlds are connected to real models and lie nearer to non-fiction. It's closely related to augmented reality, but a mirror world can be seen as an autonomous manifestation of digitized reality including virtual elements or other forms in which information is embedded.

The term in relation to digital media is coined by Yale University computer scientist David Gelernter. He first speaks of a hypothetical mirror world in 1991.

Open geo-coding standards allow users to contribute to mirror worlds. Thus it's possible to make one's own geographical data appear as a new "layer" on one's computer's copy of a mirror world.

Mirror worlds can be created via spatial computing with prime meridian as a foundation. And flatscreen XR, multisensory extended reality, simulated reality, and super cinema are terms to describe this mirror world technological convergence.

Mirror worlds can be beneficial to medical professionals, as they combine several academic disciplines and medical technologies including neuromorphic engineering which consists of the mimicking of neuro-biological architectures present in nervous systems. Mirror worlds consist of perception, motor control, multisensory integration, vision systems, head-eye systems, and auditory processing. Mirror worlds are a form of HCI human-computer interface, with ray tracing in physics and ray tracing in graphics overlapped, intertwined and mirrored indiscernible and identical.

Mirror worlds are a unification of dimensions utilizing fractals, and basic flat geometry principles.

Examples
Golden Age Volumes 1 and 2 are examples of mirror worlds. And according to their global investment banking financiers, these mirror world projects include asymmetry and 1:1 scale maps of real world settings.

Programs such as Unreal Engine, Google Earth and Microsoft Virtual Earth are examples of 3D mirror worlds.

The video game Anteworld of the Outerra engine is a mirror world that mirrors the entire planet Earth at a 1:1 scale. While the game is currently under development players can explore it in a free-camera mode, by feet as well as in vehicles such as planes, boats and cars and spawn user-made objects such as houses and (usable) vehicles. In game the user can blend in an embedded Google Maps of real Earth that is synchronized with the current camera position.

See also 

 Hyperreality
 Hyperrealism (visual arts)
 Truth claim (photography)

References

External links 
 Second Earth by Roush, W.
 AR Will Spark the Next Big Tech Platform—Call It Mirrorworld by Kelly, Kevin, Wired, February 12, 2019

Augmented reality
Virtual reality
Persistent worlds